2-Acylglycerol O-acyltransferase 2 also known as acyl-CoA:monoacylglycerol acyltransferase 2 (MGAT2) or Diacylglycerol O-acyltransferase candidate 5 (DC5)  is an enzyme that in humans is encoded by the MOGAT2 gene.

MOGAT2 and the related MOGAT3 genes are members of the acylglycerol o-acyltransferase family (DGAT2/MOGAT) and are involved in the synthesis of diacylglycerol (DAG) and triacylglycerol (TAG) from monoacylglycerol (MAG).

MOGAT2 and also MOGAT3 are single copy genes in almost all mammals. However, in ruminants both genes have undergone tandem gene expansion, indicate of evolving functionality. MOGAT2 has more than five tandemly duplicated copies in sheep with the first copy expressed in the duodenum and the last copy expressed in the skin, with no expression of any copy detected in the liver.

References

Further reading